The Night Bride is a 1927 American silent comedy film directed by E. Mason Hopper and starring Marie Prevost, Harrison Ford and Franklin Pangborn.

Cast
 Marie Prevost as Cynthia Stockton 
 Harrison Ford as Stanley Warrington 
 Franklin Pangborn as John Stockton 
 Robert Edeson as Adolphe Biggles 
 Constance Howard as Renée Stockton 
 Richard Crawford as Addison Walsh 
 George Kuwa as Japanese Gardner

References

Bibliography
 Munden, Kenneth White. The American Film Institute Catalog of Motion Pictures Produced in the United States, Part 1. University of California Press, 1997.

External links
 

1927 films
1927 comedy films
1920s English-language films
American silent feature films
Silent American comedy films
Films directed by E. Mason Hopper
American black-and-white films
Producers Distributing Corporation films
1920s American films